Timothy Butler (1806–1885) was a 19th-century British figurative sculptor.

His most noteworthy public works are the dolphin lamps lining the Thames Embankment which date from 1870 and were the first lights to be electrified (1878).

Life
He was born in Caversham in Oxfordshire in 1806. He won a silver medal at the Society of Arts in 1824. He entered the Royal Academy Schools in 1825 at the recommendation of William Behnes. He won the Royal Academy's silver medal in 1827.

He exhibited at the Royal Academy from 1828 until 1879.

Around 1850 he tutored John Adams-Acton.

From 1851 he lived at 1 Middlesex Place in London. From 1860 he lived at Marylebone Road.

He died at 186 Euston Road near St Pancras in London on 6 September 1885

Family

His daughter Clehorow Caroline Butler was also a sculptor.

Works

Bust of Thomas Musgrave, Bishop of Hereford (1839) exhibited at Royal Academy
Bust of the Earl of Granard (1841) exhibited at Royal Academy
Bust of Sir James Eyre (1842) for Corporation of Hereford
Bust of Charles Kemble (1844) exhibited at Royal Academy
Bust of the Hon Mrs Norton (1844) for Richard Brinsley Sheridan
Bust of Dr Woolff (1846) exhibited at Royal Academy
Bust of Samuel Cooper (1851) at Royal College of Surgeons
Statue of the Earl of Leicester (1858) on Dereham Town Hall
Bust of Joseph Bazalgette (1860) exhibited at Royal Academy
Bust of Sir Richard Kirby (1862) exhibited at Royal Academy
Statue of Prof John Narrien at Staff College Farnborough
Busts of Thomas Eton and his wife (1865) Bristol General Hospital
Bust of Dr William Clark (1866) Trinity College, Cambridge
Bust of Lord Rollo (1867) exhibited at Royal Academy
Bust of Charles Henry Cooper (1868) Cambridge Town Hall
Lion Heads capping sewage work outlets at South Bank Embankment (1870)
Ornate lamps on Embankment (1870)
Bust of Arthur Purvis (1870) Cocanada in Madras
Statue of Richard Cobden (1877) at Bradford Town Hall
Bust of T. Hughes (1878) exhibited at Royal Academy
Bust of Hugh Falconer at Royal Society of London
Bust of Charles Kahn
Bust of Prof Edward Turner
Bust of Edward R. Daniell

Graves

James Ince at Hadley in Hertfordshire (1829)
Anne Marriott at Horsmonden in Kent (1831)
Lady Thompson at Fareham in Hampshire (1833)
William Prescott at Hendon (1836)
Lord Douglas Hallyburton in Kensal Green Cemetery (1841)
James Ince Jr at Hadley (1845)
Edward Miller at Goudhurst in Kent (1846)
John Jackson pugilist (1849) in Brompton Cemetery
Charles Ince at Hadley (1850)
General Peter de la Motte in Kensal Green Cemetery (1861)

References

External links

1806 births
1885 deaths
19th-century British sculptors
19th-century English male artists
Alumni of the Royal Academy Schools
People from Caversham, Reading